Olong O. "Ollie" Ogbu (born May 18, 1987) is a Defensive Line coach for Wagner College in Staten Island, New York. Prior to this year he coached Defensive Line at The University of New Haven, Blinn College & Montana State University- Northern. Previously an American Football defensive end for the Spring League and Hudson Valley Fort of the Fall Experimental Football League (FXFL). Before signing with the Indianapolis Colts as an undrafted free agent in 2011, he was a team captain and four-year starter at Penn State.

Early years
At St. Joseph by the Sea High School, Ogbu’s speed and strength on the football field caught the attention of then Penn State assistant coach Brian Norwood, who recruited him to come to Penn State. He spent one year at Milford Academy, where he was named a PrepStar Magazine All-American.

College career
Nicknamed "The Staten Island Ferry" by Penn State Head Coach Joe Paterno when he arrived on campus in 2006, Ogbu redshirted his freshman year. He played in every game of the 2007 season, and was the starter for all but a couple. He finished the season with 18 tackles, 10 tackles-for-loss, one sack, and one forced fumble. He was named to the Sporting News Freshman All-Big Ten team.

Ogbu was selected to play in the 86th East-West Shrine Game played on January 22, 2011, at the Citrus Bowl Stadium in Orlando, Florida.

Ogbu earned dual Bachelor of Arts degrees in Crime, Law & Justice, and Sociology from Penn State in 2010. He is a charter member of the Eta Alpha chapter of Iota Phi Theta fraternity.

Professional career
Ogbu was signed as an undrafted free agent by the Indianapolis Colts on July 29, 2011 following the 2011 NFL lockout.

On July 22, 2012, the Colts traded him to the Philadelphia Eagles for cornerback D. J. Johnson.

On October 3, 2012, the CFL's Montreal Alouettes announced his addition to their practice roster, although later in the season, he was added to the active roster and started in three games. He had 7 tackles and a fumble recovery in the three games.

On March 10, 2014, the SaberCats traded him to the Los Angeles Kiss for Marc Schiechl. He was placed on reassignment on May 2, 2014.

References

External links
Philadelphia Eagles bio
Indianapolis Colts bio

1987 births
Living people
American football defensive tackles
Milford Academy alumni
African-American players of American football
Players of American football from New York (state)
Penn State Nittany Lions football players
Sportspeople from Staten Island
Indianapolis Colts players
Philadelphia Eagles players
Montreal Alouettes players
San Jose SaberCats players
Los Angeles Kiss players
Hudson Valley Fort players